Mullikkoräme zinc mine was active in Pyhäjärvi between the years 1989-2000. During this time 1.2 million tonnes of ore were mined. The ore contained in average 6.08% zinc, 0.30% copper and 17.05 sulphur also one tonne of ore contained 1.01 grams of gold. The ore from the mine was transported to the mine at Pyhäsalmi to be enriched. The ore was extracted during the years 1990-1993 and 1996-2000.

Sources
 Geological Survey of Finland FINZINC Database : Mullikkoräme
 GTK Tietoaineisto : The mining industry of Finland : Metal mines (In Finnish)

Copper mines in Finland
Gold mines in Finland
Sulphur mines in Finland
Zinc mines in Finland
Pyhäjärvi